The 2022 Buffalo Bulls football team will represent the University at Buffalo in the 2023 NCAA Division I FBS football season. The Bulls are led by third-year coach Maurice Linguist and play their home games at the University at Buffalo Stadium as members of the East Division of the Mid-American Conference.

Previous season

The Bulls finished the 2022 season 7–6 and 5–3 in the MAC to finish tied for second place in the East Division.  They defeated Georgia Southern the Camellia Bowl.

Schedule

Source

References

Buffalo
Buffalo Bulls football seasons
Buffalo Bulls football